Visalia Mall is an enclosed shopping mall in Visalia, California. Visalia Mall is anchored by Macy's and JCPenney.

History
Visalia Mall was the first enclosed shopping mall in California when it opened in 1964. In September 1997, the mall finished its $30 million renovation. This added a 450-seat food court, an additional  of space with a new anchor store Gottschalks, and a 3-story parking garage.
The mall was acquired in 1988 by Newman Brettin Properties. In 1997 it was purchased by JP Realty Inc. of Salt Lake City. Macy's opened at the mall in 2009 in the former Gottschalks space which closed early that year. In 2018, Macy's added a Backstage discount store in its location. In 2016, Blaze Pizza opened at the mall.

References

External links
Official site 

1964 establishments in California
Brookfield Properties
Buildings and structures in Visalia, California
Economy of Visalia, California
Shopping malls established in 1964
Shopping malls in Tulare County, California